During the 2005–06 season, Blackburn Rovers F.C. competed in the FA Premier League.

Season summary
After relegation struggles during the two previous season, Mark Hughes marked his first full season in club management by taking Blackburn to sixth place - four points off Champions League qualification - and reaching his second successive cup semi-final, in the League Cup, only to be knocked out by the eventual cup winners again, Hughes' old club Manchester United. Blackburn had been in mid-table for much of the season before gathering momentum to put real pressure on Arsenal and Tottenham Hotspur in the race for the crucial fourth place, eventually finishing in a UEFA Cup place. Rovers' good form was largely in part down to the good form of Welsh striker Craig Bellamy, a summer signing from Newcastle United, who scored 13 goals in the league. However, Bellamy would then exercise an option to enable him to move for £6 million to a Champions League club, signing for FA Cup winners Liverpool. As his replacement Hughes signed South African striker Benni McCarthy, who had helped fire Porto to the Champions League title two years earlier.

Final league table

Results
Blackburn Rovers' score comes first

Legend

FA Premier League

Results by matchday

FA Cup

League Cup

First-team squad
Squad at end of season

Left club during season

Reserve squad

Statistics

Appearances and goals

|-
! colspan=14 style=background:#dcdcdc; text-align:center| Goalkeepers

|-
! colspan=14 style=background:#dcdcdc; text-align:center| Defenders

|-
! colspan=14 style=background:#dcdcdc; text-align:center| Midfielders

|-
! colspan=14 style=background:#dcdcdc; text-align:center| Forwards

|-
! colspan=14 style=background:#dcdcdc; text-align:center| Players transferred out during the season

Notes

References

Blackburn Rovers F.C. seasons
Blackburn Rovers F.C.